Kang Boo-ja (born February 8, 1941) is a South Korean actress. Kang was studying Korean Language and Literature at Chungnam National University when she dropped out to pursue acting. She made her acting debut in 1962 and has been active on Korean stage, television and film for more than five decades.

She took a non-degree National Policy Course at Seoul National University's Graduate School of Public Administration, and entered politics in 1992. Kang was elected as a lawmaker in the 14th National Assembly.

Filmography

Television series

Film

Variety/radio show

Theater

Awards and nominations

References

External links
 
 
 
 
 

1941 births
Living people
20th-century South Korean actresses
21st-century South Korean actresses
South Korean television actresses
South Korean film actresses
South Korean stage actresses
South Korean Buddhists
Members of the National Assembly (South Korea)
Best Actress Paeksang Arts Award (television) winners